Wuruma Dam is a rural locality in the North Burnett Region, Queensland, Australia.

Geography
The Nogo River enters the locality from the north-west, passes through Lake Wuruma and over the spillway of the Wuruma Dam. It then runs east before turning south, where it forms part of the south-eastern boundary. Lake Wuruma is contained entirely within the locality.

References 

North Burnett Region
Localities in Queensland